Sarah Elshamy is an Egyptian actress.

Life and career 
Sarah was born in Egypt on 21 January 1994. She has 2 sisters. She joined the academy of arts the higher institute of theatrical arts in 2014. Her first recognized career started working with director Peter Mimi on his series, El Ab El Rohy (The Godfather). She had the leading role in the 2019 TV series Ana Sherry Dot Com (I Am Sherry Dot Com) as it was the first digital series in Egypt.

Filmography

Movies 
 Karmouz War 
Mousa 
Mako 
Febrayer El Aswad

Series 

 El Ab El Rohi 
 El Khanka
Kalabsh
Raheem
Ana Sherry Dot Com 
Forsa Tania 
Kalabsh 2
Zay El Qamar
El Gisser
Sharbat Louz
Face Abook

References 

1994 births
Egyptian actresses
Living people